Owliai (also Romanized as Owlīā’ī; also known as Owleyā’ and Owlīā’) is a village in Hegmataneh Rural District, in the Central District of Hamadan County, Hamadan Province, Iran. At the 2006 census, its population was 24, in 6 families.

References 

Populated places in Hamadan County